Rick Roberts may refer to:

 Rick Roberts (actor) (born 1965), Canadian actor
 Rick Roberts (commentator), American radio talk show host
 Rick Roberts (field hockey) (born 1967), Canadian field hockey player
 Rick Roberts (musician) (born 1949), American rock musician, founder of Firefall
 Rick Roberts (executive producer), American film producer

See also
Richard Roberts (disambiguation)
Dick Roberts (disambiguation)